Janusz Adam Kołodziej (born 18 May 1959 in Jasło) is a Polish politician. He was elected to the Sejm on 25 September 2005, getting 3786 votes in 22 Krosno district as a candidate from the League of Polish Families list.

See also
Members of Polish Sejm 2005-2007

External links
Janusz Kołodziej - parliamentary page - includes declarations of interest, voting record, and transcripts of speeches.

1959 births
Living people
People from Jasło County
Members of the Polish Sejm 2005–2007
League of Polish Families politicians